Freedom Flight, released in September 1971 on Epic Records, is the second album by Shuggie Otis. 

The album contains the original version of "Strawberry Letter 23", a 1977 hit for The Brothers Johnson.

The songs "Sweet Thang" & "Purple" appear on the soundtrack for the 2013 film Dallas Buyers Club.

Track listing

Personnel
Shuggie Otis - lead and backing vocals, guitar, bass, organ, piano, drums, bells, bottleneck guitar, tack piano
Johnny Otis - percussion, backing vocals
Wilton Felder - bass
George Duke - organ, electric piano, celesta
Aynsley Dunbar - drums
Mike Kowalski  - drums
Richard Aplanalp - tenor saxophone, oboe, flute
James "Supe" Bradshaw - harmonica, backing vocals
Venetta Fields, Clydie King, Sherlie Matthews - backing vocals

References

External links
 Shuggie Otis-Freedom Flight  at Discogs
 Shuggie Otis- Freedom Flight (lists musicians) at Discogs.com

1971 albums
Shuggie Otis albums
Epic Records albums
Albums produced by Johnny Otis